Taisto Ilmari Halonen (born 20 May 1960 in Sodankylä) is a Finnish former wrestler who competed in the 1980 Summer Olympics and in the 1984 Summer Olympics.

References

External links
 

1960 births
Living people
Olympic wrestlers of Finland
Wrestlers at the 1980 Summer Olympics
Wrestlers at the 1984 Summer Olympics
Finnish male sport wrestlers